We're The Meatmen...And You Suck!! is an album from the Michigan hardcore punk band The Meatmen, which was released in 1983 on Touch and Go Records. Despite the fact that this is a live recording, it's sometimes referred to as the band's first album. Some sources list it as a compilation album. The first seven tracks are from the band's 1982 EP Blüd Sausage, while the rest of the album was recorded in front of a live audience in New York City.

Track listing
 "The Rap" / "Tooling For Anus"
 "One Down, Three to Go"
 "Snuff 'Em"
 "Becoming a Man / Freud Was Wrong"
 "I've Got a Problem"
 "I'm Glad I'm Not a Girl"
 "Dumping Ground"
 "Meatmen Stomp" (Live)
 "Mister Tapeworm" (Live)
 "Orgy of One" (Live)
 "I Sin for a Living" (Live)
 "Crippled Children Suck" (Live)
 "Buttocks" (Live)
 "Middle Aged Youth" (Live)
 "Meat Crimes" (Live)
 "Mystery Track" (Live)

Personnel

 Tesco Vee - Vocals
 Rich Ramsey - Guitar/Bass
 Greg Ramsey - Guitar
 Mike Achtenburg - Bass
 Mr. X - Drums
 Berl Johnson - Drums

References

External links
 http://www.tgrec.com/bands/album.php?id=325

1983 live albums
The Meatmen albums